Crime Next Door is an Indian web series from Disney+ Hotstar Quix. The Hindi language mini web series was released on 28 May 2021. It is available on online streaming platform Disney+ Hotstar Quix app to watch online.

Cast
 Ravi Sah as Inspector Shekhawat
 Girish Kulkarni as Ranjeet Singh
 Madhura Welankar Satam as Shweta Singh
 Anupriya Goenka as Sujata
 Sahil Vaid as Aneer
 Aham Sharma as Dushyant
 Vatsal Sheth as Amit
 Ipshita Chakraborty Singh	as Shashi
 Trishna Singh as Anjali
 Gagan Pareek as Bus Driver
 Boloram Das as Kishore
 Rajendra Gupta
 Mohan Kapur
 Yashpal Sharma

Development
On 27 May 2021, first trailer of the web show was released on YouTube. On 28 May 2021, all episodes of the web series were aired on Hotstar.

References

External links
 Crime Next Door on Hotstar
 

Indian drama web series
2021 web series debuts
Hindi-language web series
Hindi-language Disney+ Hotstar original programming